Angioma serpiginosum is characterized by minute, copper-colored to bright red angiomatous puncta that have a tendency to become papular.

See also
 Skin lesion
 List of cutaneous conditions

References

External links 

 

Dermal and subcutaneous growths